Mizuhopecten is a genus of bivalves belonging to the family Pectinidae.

The species of this genus are found in Far East Asia.

Species:

Mizuhopecten kitamiensis 
Mizuhopecten yessoensis

References

Pectinidae
Bivalve genera